Connell, also called Great Connell, is a barony in County Kildare, Republic of Ireland.

Etymology
Connell derives its name from Old Connell (Irish Seancongbhail/Seanchonail, "old settlement"), a site in modern Newbridge where Saint Conleth lived as a hermit until his consecration in AD 490. Later it was the site of Connell Ford, a crossing point on the Liffey, and Great Connell Priory was built on the east bank in 1202.

Location

Connell barony is found in central County Kildare, from the bend of the Liffey to the Hill of Allen.

History
Connell barony was part of the ancient territory of the Uí Fáeláin sept of the Uí Dúnlainge branch of the Laigin sept, and ancestral home of the Uí Broin before the arrival of the Normans. The Uí Thuathail (O'Tooles), allies of the O'Byrnes, were also here.

List of settlements

Below is a list of settlements in Connell barony:
Allenwood
Athgarvan
Kilmeage
Newbridge
Robertstown

References

Baronies of County Kildare